This Is Rock'n'Roll is rock band the Quireboys's third studio album, it is the first album recorded after the band re-united. Their last album before this was recorded in 1993.

Track listing
All songs written by Spike Gray and Guy Griffin except as indicated.

 "This Is Rock'n'Roll"
 "Show Me What You Got"
 "Searching"
 "Six Degrees"
 "C'mon"
 "Seven Days"
 "Taken for a Ride"
 "Coldharbour Lane" (Gray)
 "Turn Away"
 "To Be"
 "Enough for One Lifetime"
 "Its Alright"
 "Never Let Me Go"

The PROMO-Release contains the track "High All the Time" that didn't find
its way to the official release, replaced by "Never Let Me Go". The tracks are :

 "This Is Rock'n'Roll"
 "Show Me What You Got"
 "Searchin'"
 "Six Degrees"
 "Come on"
 "Seven Days"
 "Taken For A Ride"
 "Coldharbour Lane"
 "Turn Away"
 "To Be"
 "Enough For One Lifetime"
 "High All the Time"
 "Its Alright"

Band
Spike – vocals
Guy Griffin – guitar
Luke Bossendorfer – guitar
Nigel Mogg – bass
Martin Henderson – drums and percussion
Kevin Savigar – keyboards

2001 albums
The Quireboys albums
Sanctuary Records albums